The Himalayan region of India is home to some of the most notable glaciers in the world, including the Siachen Glacier, the second-largest non-polar glacier on Earth and the largest glacier in India. The following is a list of the most important glaciers in India. Most glaciers lie in the union territory of Ladakh and the states of Himachal Pradesh, Sikkim, and Uttarakhand.

Few glaciers are also found in Arunachal Pradesh.

List of Indian glaciers

Arunachal Pradesh
In Arunachal Pradesh, glaciers are found in Great Himalayas ranges which run along the Tibetan border. All peaks here rise above 4500 meters and are snow covered throughout the year.

Important glaciers include:

Bichom Glacier
Kangto Glacier
Mazgol Glacier

Himachal Pradesh
Bara Shigri Glacier
BCB Glacier (bcb land)
Beas Kund glacier
Bhadal Glacier
Bhaga Glacier
Chandra Glacier
Chandra Nahan Glacier
Chhota Shigri
Dhaka Glacier
North Dakka Glacier
Gora Glacier
The Lady of Keylong
Miyar Glacier
Mukkila Glacier
Parvathi and Dudhon
Perad Glacier
Sonapani
Gara
Gor Gorang
Shaune Gorang
Nagpo Tokpo

Sikkim
Zemu Glacier
Rathong Glacier
Lonak Glacier

Union Territory of Ladakh 

Siachen Glacier – the second-longest glacier outside the polar regions and the largest glacier in the Himalayas-Karakoram region.
Hari parbat Glacier
Chong Kmdan Glacier
Drang-Drung Glacier
Kazi N Glacier
Machoi Glacier
Nubra Glacier
Nun Kun
Parkachik Glacier
Shafat Glacier
Shirwali Glacier
Rimo Glacier
Tayseer Glacier

Uttarakhand

Arwa Glacier
Bagini Glacier
Bhagirathi Kharak Glacier
Bandarpunch
Changabang Glacier
Chaturangi Glacier
Chorabari Glacier
Dakshini Nanda Devi Glacier
Dakshini Rishi Glacier
Dokriani Glacier
Gangotri Glacier
Ghanohim Bamak
Jaundhar Glacier
Kafni Glacier
Kalabaland Glacier
Kedar Bamak Glacier
Kirti Bamak
Lawan Glacier
Maiandi Bamak
Mana Glacier
Meola Glacier
Meru Bamak
Milam Glacier
Namik Glacier
Panchchuli Glacier
Panpatia Glacier
Paschimi Kamet Glacier
Pindari Glacier
Purbi Kamet Glacier
Raikana Glacier
Raktavarn Glacier
Ralam Glacier
Ramani Glacier
Satopanth Glacier
Seeta Glacier
Shalang Glacier
Sona Glacier
Suralaya Glacier
Sunderdhunga Glacier
Swachhand Glacier
Swetvarn Glacier
Thelu Glacier
Tipra Bamak
Trisul Glacier
Uttari Nanda Devi Glacier
Uttari Rishi Glacier
Vasuki Glacier

See also
 List of glaciers

References

 
Glaciers
India
.